The Kimball Stage Stop was a station on the Overland Trail near Park City, Utah. Located in the Parley's Park valley near U.S. Route 40 at the head of Parley's Canyon, the station was built by William H. Kimball in 1862. Kimball also built a bridge across nearby Kimball Creek. The station's hotel was notable for its dinners, and was visited by Mark Twain, Walt Whitman and Horace Greeley, served at first by Kimball's wife Melissa Burton Coray Kimball, and later by another of Kimball's wives, Martha Vance Kimball, . The station also served the Holladay Stage and the Wells Fargo Express Company.

The chief building in the complex is the hotel. It is a T-shaped two-story sandstone building, housing dining rooms, guest rooms, a store, and for a time, a post office. Two log barns are part of the complex.

The Kimball Stage Stop was placed on the National Register of Historic Places on April 16, 1971.

References

External links

Hotel buildings on the National Register of Historic Places in Utah
Historic American Buildings Survey in Utah
Buildings and structures in Summit County, Utah
Historic districts on the National Register of Historic Places in Utah
National Register of Historic Places in Summit County, Utah
Stagecoach stations on the National Register of Historic Places
Stagecoach stations in Utah
Transportation buildings and structures on the National Register of Historic Places in Utah